The Cathedral of the Holy Trinity is a Roman Catholic cathedral in New Ulm, Minnesota, United States and is the seat of the Diocese of New Ulm.

History

The Catholic presence in New Ulm can trace its beginnings to the missionary work of the Rev. Franz Weninger, SJ in the middle 19th century.   The first church was a wood structure built in 1858.  Construction of the church proved to be slow and it was destroyed by the defenders of New Ulm before it was completed so that members of the Dakota tribe could not use it as a barricade in the Dakota War of 1862.

After the conflict was resolved Michael Lauterbach gave Bishop Thomas Grace two lots for the construction of a church.  The cornerstone for the new church was laid on September 1, 1866.  The Rev. Alexander Berghold was assigned as the first resident priest at New Ulm in 1868.  The new church, which measured 36 x 97 feet, was dedicated by Bishop Grace on December 11, 1870.  The structure was destroyed by a tornado on July 15, 1881.  Fundraising for a new church was completed by September 1888.

A.C. Ochs signed a contract to build the present church on March 29, 1890, and the cornerstone was laid on May 4, 1890.  The steeple was completed in 1893 and the interior decorations were finished in 1903.  The wall decorations of the Baroque style building are of numerous saints, angels and the life of Christ painted in dark colors and accented in gold leaf.  An apse features an image of the Holy Trinity with the Twelve Apostles.  Alexander Schwendinger was commissioned to decorate the interior and he was assisted by Christ Heller and Anton Gag.  The two side entrances to the church were added in 1940 as was the terrazzo floor.

The Diocese of New Ulm was established by Pope Pius XII on November 18, 1957.   Holy Trinity was named as the diocese’s new cathedral.  The Msgr. Alphonse Schladweiler of St. Paul was named the first Bishop of New Ulm and was consecrated in Holy Trinity.

Another renovation of the cathedral was completed in 1987.  The lower level of the church was renovated into a community hall and named in honor of a former pastor, Msgr. Antony Leifeld.

See also
List of Catholic cathedrals in the United States
List of cathedrals in the United States

References
Holy Trinity Church of New Ulm, Minnesota  “A Record of 75 years”  1869-1944

External links
Cathedral  website
Diocese of New Ulm website

Churches in the Roman Catholic Diocese of New Ulm
Buildings and structures in Brown County, Minnesota
Holy Trinity
New Ulm, Minnesota
Religious organizations established in 1858
1858 establishments in Minnesota
Roman Catholic churches completed in 1893
19th-century Roman Catholic church buildings in the United States